The 1973 Idaho Vandals football team represented the University of Idaho in the 1973 NCAA Division I football season. The Vandals were led by fourth-year head coach Don Robbins and were members of the Big Sky Conference, then in Division II. They played their home games at new Idaho Stadium, an unlit outdoor facility on campus in Moscow, Idaho.

Season

In the Battle of the Palouse, Idaho suffered a sixth straight loss to neighbor Washington State of the Pac-8, falling   in Pullman 

In their third game with new rival Boise State and first in Moscow, the Vandals fell at home  on September 15;  this was the only outdoor meeting in Moscow in the series.  The Broncos went on to win the first of three consecutive conference championships. Idaho did not schedule Northern Arizona until 1975 and both played only five games in conference.

At the conclusion of the season, Robbins' contract was not  He was succeeded by  a Vandal assistant coach since 1967 and also the head coach of the

Division I
Through 1977, the Big Sky was a Division II conference for football, except for Division I member Idaho, which moved down to I-AA in 1978. Idaho maintained its upper division status in the NCAA by playing Division I non-conference opponents (and was ineligible for the Division II postseason).

Schedule

Roster

All-conference
Four Vandals were selected to the Big Sky all-conference team: tight end Bill Kashetta, defensive tackle Lloyd Grimsrud, cornerback Randy Hall and safety Bucky Bruns. Three were named to the second team (honorable mention): running back Mark Fredback, wide receiver Tim Coles, and offensive tackle

NFL Draft
Two Vandal seniors were selected in the 1974 NFL Draft, which lasted seventeen rounds (442 selections).

List of Idaho Vandals in the NFL Draft

References

External links
Gem of the Mountains: 1974 University of Idaho yearbook – 1973 football season
Go Mighty Vandals – 1973 – Idaho and the PCAA part II
Game program: Idaho at Washington State –  September 29, 1973
Idaho Argonaut – student newspaper – 1973 editions
University of Idaho Library - digital collections – 1973 Idaho football coaching staff

Idaho
Idaho Vandals football seasons
Idaho Vandals football